Sushma Ahuja is an Indian director, writer and actor who has worked on Hindi and Tamil films and theatre productions.

Career
Sushma began her career as a singer with All India Radio and a dancer during her teenage years, before becoming involved in the Hindi theatre circuit, where she worked on Hindi, Urdu and Punjabi performances. In 1977, Sushma relocated to Madras with her family as a result of her husband's job, and then worked closely with a theatre group called "Abhudhay", which performed Hindi, Tamil and English shows. She became acquainted with film makers including Singeetham Srinivasa Rao and L. V. Prasad who encouraged her to take up film direction, so she subsequently apprenticed under Balu Mahendra, T. Rama Rao and Yash Chopra on a number of films.

Sushma regularly helped work on Hindi versions of Tamil films, often transliterating dialogues. She was also credited for assisting actress Sridevi in her transition to work in Hindi films by helping her with Hindi dialogues.

Sushma has been credited as an actress, writer and director in films. Notably, she directed an animated series titled Tara Ki Duniya for DD Metro, and Uyirodu Uyiraga (1998), a romantic drama featuring Ajith Kumar and her daughter Richa Ahuja. The film released to positive reviews, with a critic noting that the film was "a clean movie with no masala stuff" but criticized the "weak story-line". Another critic drew particular praise to the role of Srividya, claiming the film was "a pleasant experience, the crowds cheered Srividya almost as much as Ajith". The film failed commercially, with Sushma Ahuja blaming the result on poor promotion. She has worked on the script for films including Little John (2001) and Ek Alag Mausam (2003). Her acting roles include appearances in M. Night Shyamalan's English film Praying with Anger (1992) and Sridevi's television series Malini Iyer (2004).

Personal life
Sushma Ahuja has 3 children, including actors Suhaas Ahuja & Richa, who has appeared in films such as Uyirodu Uyiraga (1998) and Dumm Dumm Dumm (2001).

Partial filmography

References

External links

Living people
20th-century Indian film directors
Tamil film directors
Film directors from Chennai
Indian women film directors
Tamil screenwriters
Indian women screenwriters
Screenwriters from Chennai
Year of birth missing (living people)
20th-century Indian women